Estrada Parque is a Federal District Metro brazilian station on Green line. It was opened on 6 January 2019 on the already operating section of the line, from Central to Terminal Ceilândia. It is located between Concessionárias and Praça do Relógio.

References

Brasília Metro stations
2019 establishments in Brazil
Railway stations opened in 2019